The 1921 Abingdon by-election was held on 14 May 1921.  The by-election was held due to the resignation of the incumbent Coalition Conservative MP, John Tyson Wigan.  It was won by the unopposed Coalition Conservative candidate Arthur Loyd.

Result

References

1921 in England
By-election, 1921
Abingdon 1921
Abingdon 1921
Abingdon 1921
Abingdon 1921
Abingdon 1921
Abingdon by-election